Sarah K. Taylor may refer to:

 Sarah Katherine Taylor (1847-1920), American evangelist, temperance worker, editor
 Sarah Knox Taylor (1814-1835), daughter of the 12th U.S. President, Zachary Taylor